Ivan Fyodorov (died ) was a Russian navigator and commanding officer of the expedition to northern Alaska in 1732.

After the First Kamchatka expedition of Vitus Bering, Russian exploration efforts were continued by Bering's lieutenant Martin Spanberg and the navigator Fyodorov. In 1732, with participants of the First Kamchatka expedition, land-surveyor Mikhail Gvozdev, and the navigator K. Moshkov, Fyodorov sailed to Dezhnev Cape, the easternmost point of Asia, in the St. Gabriel (Sviatoi Gavriil). From there, after having replenished the water supply on 5 August, they sailed east and soon came near the mainland at the Cape Prince of Wales. They charted the northwestern coast of Alaska and mapped their route. By doing this, Fyodorov and Gvozdev completed the discovery of the Bering Strait, once started by Semyon Dezhnyov and Fedot Alekseyev and continued by Bering. Their expedition also discovered three previously unknown islands.

See also
 Great Northern Expedition

References 

1733 deaths
Explorers of Alaska
Explorers of Asia
Explorers from the Russian Empire
Russian explorers of North America
Year of birth unknown